Christian Kerez (born 27 May 1962 in Maracaibo) is a Swiss architect, architectural photographer and a university professor.

Biography 
Christian Kerez studied at ETH Zurich and worked for Rudolf Fontana from 1991 til 1993. He worked in the field of architecture photography and opened in 1993 his own studio in Zurich. Kerez has been a visiting professor in design and architecture at the Swiss Federal Institute of Technology since 2001, as assistant professor since 2003 and as full professor for design and architecture since 2009. In 2012 he held the Kenzo Tange Chair at Harvard University Graduate School of Design. 
At the 15th International Architecture Exhibition at the Venice Biennale Kerez designed the Swiss Pavilion.

Work 

Kerez photographed for Valerio Olgiati, Herzog & de Meuron, Bearth & Deplazes and Miroslav Šik.

At office of Rudolf Fontana
 1992–1993: Oberrealta Chapel, Cazis
 1992–1993: Mortuary, Bonaduz

Own buildings

 1998–2000: Kunstmuseum Liechtenstein, Vaduz with Morger & Degelo, Basel
 1999–2003: Apartment building on Forsterstrasse, Zurich
 1999–2003: Schoolhouse Breiten, Eschenbach
 2002–2009: Schoolhouse Leutschenbach, Zurich with landscape architect Maurus Schifferli
 2004–2007: House with one wall, Zurich
 2006–2013: House with a Lakeview, Thalwil
 2006–2014: Museum of Modern Art, Warsaw competition 1st prize
 2008: Holcim Competence Center, Holderbank competition 1st prize
 2009–2014: House with a missing column', Zurich
 2009–2013: Porto Seguro Housing Development Project, Paraisopolis, São Paulo
 2013–2018: Office Building, Lyon Confluence Îlot A3, Lyon
 2013–2021: House Tomio Okamura, Prague 
 2021: The Bahrain Pavilion at Expo 2020, Dubai (delayed one year because of the COVID-19 pandemic)

Awards and distinctions (selection) 

 1999: Swiss Art Award
 2005: Betonpreis 05, 1st prize for the apartment building on Forsterstrasse, Zurich
 2011: European Steel Design Award, for school building Leutschenbach Zurich
 2012: Fellow of the Royal Institute of British Architects
 2012: Kenzo Tange Chair for Architecture, Harvard University Graduate School of Design, Cambridge
 2014: recognition - Daylight-Award for school building Leutschenbach Zurich
 2015: Holcim Awards Europe 2014, Honorable Mention to energy-efficient office building in Holderbank, Switzerland

Bibliography 

 Gerold Wiederin, Helmut Federle: Nachtwallfahrtskapelle Locherboden. Publ. by Kunsthaus Bregenz with Edelbert Köb, text by Johannes Gachnang, photo-essay by Christian Kerez, Verlag Gerd Hatje, Stuttgart 1997, 
 Kunstmuseum Liechtenstein, Morger Degelo Kerez Architects, texts by Hans Frei, Friedemann Malsch, Norbert Jansen, photo-essay by Thomas Flechtner. Lars Müller Publishers, Baden 2000, 
 Valerio Olgiati, Das Gelbe Haus, Kunsthaus Bregenz, archiv kunst architektur, Werkdokumente 19, 2000, Hatje Cantz Verlag, ISBN 3-7757-1004-3, 82 pages
 Les échelles de la réalité. L’architecture de Christian Kerez. Exhibition catalogue. Texts by Martin Steinmann and Christian Kerez, EPFL, Lausanne 2006
 Conflicts Politics Construction Privacy Obsession. Materials on the Work of Christian Kerez. Texts by Hubertus Adam, Marcel Andino, Hans Frei, Tibor Joanelly. Moritz Küng (ed.) and deSingel international arts campus, Antwerp and Hatje Cantz Verlag, Ostfildern 2008, 
 El Croquis 145: Christian Kerez 2000-2009. Fundamentos arquitectonicos, basics on architecture. Texts by Georg Frank, Hans Frei and Christian Kerez, El Croquis, Madrid 2009, 
 Christian Kerez: Uncertain Certainty, Publ.: Toto, Tokyo 2013, 
 El Croquis 182: Christian Kerez 2010-2015. With a Glossary by Christian Kerez, El Croquis, Madrid 2015;

Exhibitions (selection) 

 2006: Les échelles de la réalité. L’architecture de Christian Kerez, with catalogue, EPFL Lausanne
 2006:	Innenansichten, Arbeiten von Christian Kerez, Swiss Architecture Museum, Basle
 2008: Progetti 1988–2007, Accademia di Architettura di Mendrisio
 2008: Conflicts Politics Construction Privacy Obsession, De Singel Int. Art Campus, Antwerp and CASA Vertigo/ Technische Universiteit, Eindhoven
 2009: Traum & Wirklichkeit, aut. architektur und tirol, Innsbruck
 2010: People meet in Architecture, Italian Pavilion (participation), 12th International Architecture Biennale in Venice, curated by: Kazuyo Sejima 
 2013: Contrast & Continuity, Harvard University Graduate School of Design, Cambridge
 2013: The Rule of the Game, Toto Gallery MA, Tokyo
 2016: Incidental Space, Pavilion of Switzerland, 15th Venice Biennale

References

Footnotes

External links
 Christian Kerez Official Website
 ETH Zurich, Christian Kerez Chair of Architecture and Design

1962 births
Living people
Swiss architects
ETH Zurich